La Valentina is a Mexican musical drama film directed by Martín de Lucenay and starring Jorge Negrete and Esperanza Baur. The film was remade in 1966 as La Valentina starring María Félix and Eulalio González.

Cast
Jorge Negrete	 ...	El Tigre
Esperanza Baur	 ...	Valentina
Raúl de Anda	 ...	Miguel
Paco Asto ...	Celedonio
Pepe Martínez	 ...	Hilario
Sofía Haller	 ...	Lucia
Consuelo Segarra	 ...	Madre de Valentina
David Valle González	 ...	Pancho
Paco Martínez	 ...	Don Laureano
Alfredo Varela	 ...	Don Fructoso

External links

Mexican Revolution films
1930s musical drama films
Mexican black-and-white films
Mexican musical drama films
1930s Mexican films